Leopold Anthony Skeete (born 3 August 1949) is an English former professional footballer who played as a forward.

Born in Liverpool, Skeete played non-League football for Burscough and Ellesmere Port Town before signing for Rochdale in April 1973. He played 40 Football League games for Rochdale, scoring 14 goals, before returning to non-League football with Mossley in 1975, serving as caretaker manager in January 1978. He signed for Runcorn in 1982 for £3,500, and then Altrincham in 1983, before retiring in 1984.

References

External links

1949 births
Living people
English footballers
Burscough F.C. players
Ellesmere Port Town F.C. players
Rochdale A.F.C. players
Mossley A.F.C. players
Runcorn F.C. Halton players
Altrincham F.C. players
English Football League players
Association football forwards
Footballers from Liverpool
Mossley A.F.C. managers
English football managers